The Hong Kong Special Administrative Region deputies to the National People's Congress, HKSAR members of the National Committee of the Chinese People's Political Consultative Conference and representatives of relevant national organisations functional constituency, also known as HKSAR members of NPC and CPPCC, representatives of national organisations functional constituency, is a functional constituency in the elections for the Legislative Council of Hong Kong first created in 2021. The constituency is composed of Hong Kong deputies to the National People's Congress (NPC), members of the National Committee of the Chinese People's Political Consultative Conference (CPPCC), delegates of the All-China Women's Federation, executive members of the All-China Federation of Industry and Commerce, committee members of the All-China Federation of Returned Overseas Chinese, committee members of the All-China Youth Federation, and directors of the China Overseas Friendship Association.

Return members

Electoral results

2020s

References

Constituencies of Hong Kong
Constituencies of Hong Kong Legislative Council
Functional constituencies (Hong Kong)
2021 establishments in Hong Kong
Constituencies established in 2021